The Clay Center Cubs were an American minor league baseball team founded in 1909 in the Central Kansas League. After the 1911 season, the team ceased operations until 1913, when they reformed and joined the Kansas State League.

Notable former players include George Aiton and Gil Britton.

References 

Defunct baseball teams in Kansas
Cubs
1909 establishments in Kansas
1913 disestablishments in Kansas
Baseball teams disestablished in 1913
Baseball teams established in 1909
Central Kansas League teams
Kansas State League teams